DI-6 may refer to:

 Kochyerigin DI-6, two-seat fighter biplane produced in Soviet Union
 NSB Di 6, class of diesel-electric locomotives built by Siemens